1,2-Difluorobenzene, also known as DFB, is an aromatic compound with formula CHF. This colorless liquid is a solvent used in the electrochemical studies of transition metal complexes.  Compared to most conventional halogenated aliphatic and aromatic solvents, it possesses an exceptionally high dielectric constant (ε0 = 13.8 at 300 K).  Thus, it can be a suitable solvent for cationic, and/or highly electrophilic organometallic complexes.

Synthesis 
1,2-Difluorobenzene is prepared by a simple substitution reaction of fluorine with fluorobenzene.

CHF + F → CHF + HF

The 1,4-isomer and small amounts of the 1,3-isomer are also produced in the reaction as the fluorine group on the aromatic ring of fluorobenzene is ortho- and para- directing.

Applications 
1,2-Difluorobenzene has been used as solvent for the electrochemical analysis of transition metal complexes. It is relatively chemically inert, weakly coordinating, and has a dielectric constant high enough to dissolve many electrolytes and metal complex salts. It is used as a weakly coordinating solvent for metal complexes, alternative to the relatively more strongly coordinating solvents acetonitrile, DMSO, and DMF.

It has a role as an anaesthetic.

1,2-Difluorobenzene can be acylated to 3',4'-difluoropropiophenone, which has interesting application in the synthesis of halogenated cathinone/PPA congeners.

Hazards
DFB is a highly flammable liquid and vapour. Hazardous decomposition products formed under fire conditions include carbon oxides, and hydrogen fluoride. Handle with thick fluorinated rubber gloves.

References 

Fluoroarenes
Halogenated solvents
Aromatic solvents